Gymnobathra philadelpha is a moth in the family Oecophoridae first described by Edward Meyrick in 1883. It is endemic to New Zealand.

References

Moths described in 1883
Oecophoridae
Taxa named by Edward Meyrick
Moths of New Zealand
Endemic fauna of New Zealand
Endemic moths of New Zealand